The Frauen DFB-Pokal 1992–93 was the 13th season of the cup competition, Germany's second-most important title in women's football. In the final, held in Berlin on 12 June 1993, TSV Siegen defeated Grün-Weiß Brauweiler 6–5 on penalties; the game had ended 1–1 after extra time. It was Siegen's fifth cup title.

First round 

Several clubs had byes in the first round. Those clubs were automatically qualified for the 2nd round of the cup.

Second round

Third round

Quarter-finals

Semi-finals

Final

See also 

 Bundesliga 1992–93
 1992–93 DFB-Pokal men's competition

References 

DFB-Pokal Frauen seasons
Pokal
Fra